Melhania polyneura is a plant in the family Malvaceae.

Description
Inflorescences are four-flowered. The flowers have yellow petals.

Distribution and habitat
The type specimen of Melhania polyneura, no longer extant, was collected in 1895 in Mwanza District, Tanzania. Changes in area land use to small farms since the initial specimen have resulted in the IUCN assessment as Critically Endangered.

References

polyneura
Endemic flora of Tanzania
Plants described in 1900
Taxa named by Karl Moritz Schumann